Papuaseius is a genus of mites in the Phytoseiidae family.

Species
 Papuaseius dominiquae (Schicha & Gutierrez, 1985)

References

Phytoseiidae